Centro is a barrio of Montevideo, Uruguay. Its main axis is 18 de Julio Avenue, and it runs between Plaza Independencia and Ejido St, being the central business district.

The first neighborhood of the city after the demolition of the walls in the first half of the 19th century, it is one of the liveliest and busiest areas of the city, concentrating a large number of offices, commercial spaces and entertainment venues. Politically located in Municipality B of the Department of Montevideo, is also an area known for its preserved European architecture.

History

Due to Montevideo's military origins, for years it was forbidden to build anything permanent outside the walls of the walled city. The area outside the walls was known as "Campo de Marte" or "Ejido". However in 1829 the Constituent General Assembly of the newly created Uruguayan State approved a law that provided for the demolition of the walls of Montevideo. After this decision, the walled city became an open city, and therefore, an urban layout was made to extend it beyond the Ciudad Vieja, in what would be known as Ciudad Nueva ("New City"). The plans included a new city square, which in 1840 took on the name Plaza Cagancha. The development of this area was very slow due to the Uruguayan Civil War.

Landmarks
The main sights of the neighborhood are on 18 de Julio Avenue. There are two important city squares: Plaza Fabini, commonly known as Plaza del Entrevero, and Plaza de Cagancha.

Centro is the area of the city with the greatest diversity of architectural styles, mainly European, due to the influence that the country received due to immigration. On one hand, art deco is present in different buildings, such as the Salvo, Rinaldi and Díaz palaces. On the other hand, eclecticism is evident in the Palacio Piria, seat of the Supreme Court, the Buxareo House, seat of the French embassy in Uruguay, the Jockey Club headquarters building, and the Ateneo de Montevideo, among others.

This district houses different government buildings, such as the Executive Tower, workplace of the President, the Palacio Santos, seat of the Ministry of Foreign Relations, the Montevideo City Hall, the Supreme Court and the headquarters of ANCAP, the state-owned oil company.

Gallery

Places of worship
Several temples have been built in this important neighbourhood.
 St. Michael Garicoits Church, popularly known as "Iglesia de los Vascos" (Roman Catholic, Betharram Fathers)
 Church of St. Joseph and St. Maximilian Kolbe, also known as "Conventuales" (Roman Catholic, Conventual Franciscans)
 Central Methodist Church (Methodist)
 Uruguayan Jewish Community (Synagogue)
 New Jewish Congregation (Conservative synagogue)
 Vaad Ha'ir (Synagogue)
 Uruguay Islamic Center (Muslim)

Street map and main attractions

See also 
Barrios of Montevideo

References

External links 

 Intendencia de Montevideo / Useful data / Centro
 Intendencia de Montevideo / Historia del Centro

 
Barrios of Montevideo
Montevideo